KBR Tower (formerly the M. W. Kellogg Tower) is a 550 ft (167.6 m) tall skyscraper in Downtown Houston, Texas, United States; it is a part of the Cullen Center complex. The KBR Tower has the headquarters of KBR, Inc., an engineering, procurement, and construction company.

The design architect was Neuhaus & Taylor, the general contractor was Linbeck Construction Company, the mechanical engineer was Sam P. Wallace, and the structural engineer was Ellisor Engineering, Inc. The building was completed in 1973.

History
By 1991, Dresser Industries and its subsidiary, M. W. Kellogg, switched office buildings. The skyscraper was renamed the M. W. Kellogg Tower. In exchange Dresser took over space at 3 Greenway Plaza, which had been renamed to the Dresser Tower. The building swap satisfied Kellogg's need for more space.

In 1998, Exxon announced that it was forming a new subsidiary, Exxon Upstream Development Co. The company planned to initially house the company in the Kellogg Tower before moving it to the Greenspoint business district.

By 2001, Halliburton owned the tower in a joint venture with TrizecHahn. In August of that year, Halliburton announced that it would consolidate 8,000 local employees to office space in Westchase. In December 2001 Halliburton canceled its plans to relocate employees to Westchase. Nancy Sarnoff of the Houston Business Journal said that it made more sense for the company to lease existing space instead of constructing new office space in times of economic downturns.

In 2004, Jeanneret & Associates renewed its lease of  space in the KBR Tower for 10 years.

In 2011 Brookfield Properties Corp. offered a 50% interest in the KBR Tower for sale. Paul Layne, Suresh Brookfield's Houston area executive vice president, said that the KBR lease made the building a major candidate for the sale of its interest. KBR owns the other 50% interest. Layne did not state whether KBR had the right of first refusal on Brookfield's interest. Layne said that confidentiality concerns were why he did not reveal the information.

In 2012 an affiliate of W.P. Carey purchased the KBR Tower.

Gallery

See also

List of tallest buildings in Houston

References

External links

Emporis
Skyscraperpage
Brookfield Properties

Skyscraper office buildings in Houston
Office buildings completed in 1973
Brookfield Properties buildings
Buildings and structures in Houston
1973 establishments in Texas
Downtown Houston